Fred Otto Robsahm (29 June 1943 – 26 March 2015) was a Norwegian film actor. He worked on a few Italian Spaghetti Westerns in the 1960s and 1970s. He was married to Italian film actress Agostina Belli for 15 years. The story of Robsahm's life was told by Even Benestad in the documentary Natural Born Star, which premiered in 2007. His sister is the model, film director, and editor Margarete Robsahm.

Robsahm contracted HIV at the end of the 1980s.

Selected filmography 
 1968 Barbarella
 1969 Flashback
 1969 Nel giorno del signore
 1971 Black Killer
 1973 Sepolta viva
 1973 Ingrid sulla strada
 1974 Il figlio della sepolta viva
 1974 Young Lucrezia 
 1974 Carambola
 1975 So Young, So Lovely, So Vicious...
 2007 Natural Born Star

References

External links 
 Norwegian film foundation on Natural born star

1943 births
2015 deaths
Norwegian male film actors